Vanities is a HBO television presentation of the comedy-drama stage production of the play of the same title written by Jack Heifner.

Background
The television production premiered on HBO in March 1981 as part of the channel's Standing Room Only series. The story concerns the lives, loves and friendship of three Texas cheerleaders starting from high school to post college graduation. The television special starred Annette O'Toole, Meredith Baxter Birney and Shelley Hack as the threesome. The play was created by Jack Heifner.

The HBO presentation was one of several stage shows that aired on the premium network in the 1980s. Other HBO productions included Richard Harris in Camelot as well as Frank Langella in the title role as Sherlock Holmes.

Cast
 Annette O'Toole as Kathy
 Meredith Baxter Birney as Joanne
 Shelley Hack as Mary

See also
 Standing Room Only
 On Location
 HBO

References

External links
 

HBO original programming
1981 American television series debuts
1981 American television series endings
1980s American comedy-drama television series
English-language television shows
HBO Shows (series) WITHOUT Episode info, list, or Article